European Russia is the western and most populated part of Russia. It is geographically situated in Europe, as opposed to the country's sparsely populated and vastly larger eastern part, which is situated in Asia, encompassing the entire northern region of the continent. The Ural Mountains divide Russia into two parts, bisecting the Eurasian supercontinent. European Russia covers the vast majority of Eastern Europe, and spans roughly 40% of Europe's total landmass, with over 15% of its total population, making Russia the largest and most populous country in Europe.

Area and demographics 
European Russia accounts for about 75% of Russia's total population. European Russia is the densest region of Russia, with a population density of 27.5 people per km2 (70 per sq mi). European Russia counts for about 15% of Europe’s total population.

All three federal cities of Russia lie within European Russia. These cities are Moscow, the nation's capital and largest city, which is the second most populous city in  Europe; Saint Petersburg, the cultural capital and the second-most populous city in the country; and Sevastopol, located in Crimea, which is internationally recognized as part of Ukraine.

History

The historical population of European Russia was composed of Slavic, Finnic, Germanic, Turkic, Jewish, North Caucasian, Baltic, Khazarian and Norse peoples.
 
Some theories say that some early Eastern Slavs arrived in modern-day western Russia (also in Ukraine and Belarus) sometime during the middle of the first millennium AD. The Eastern Slavic tribe of the Vyatichis was native to the land around the Oka river. Finno-Ugric, Baltic and Turkic tribes were also present in the area (although large parts of the Turkic and Finno-Ugric people were absorbed by the Slavs, there are great minorities in European Russia today). The western region of Central Russia was inhabited by the Eastern Slavic tribe of the Severians.

One of the first Rus' regions according to the Sofia First Chronicle was Veliky Novgorod in 859. In late 8th and early-to-mid-9th centuries AD the Rus' Khaganate was formed in modern western Russia. The region was a place of operations for Varangians, eastern Scandinavian adventurers, merchants, and pirates. From the late 9th to the mid-13th century a large section of today's European Russia was part of Kievan Rus'. The lands of Rus' Khaganate and Kievan Rus' were important trade routes and connected Scandinavia, Byzantine Empire, Rus' people and Volga Bulgaria with Khazaria and Persia. According to old Scandinavian sources among the 12 biggest cities of Kievan Rus' or Ancient Rus' were Novgorod, Kiev, Polotsk, Smolensk, Murom and Rostov.

Through trade and cultural contact with Byzantine Empire, the Slavic culture of the Rus' adopted gradually the Eastern Orthodox religion. Many sources say that Ryazan, Kolomna, Moscow, Vladimir and Kiev were destroyed by the Mongol Empire. After the Mongol invasion the Muscovite Rus' arose, over all this time, western Russia and the various Rus' regions had strong cultural contacts with the Byzantine Empire, while the Slavic culture was cultivated all the time. The elements of East Slavic paganism and Christianity overlapped each other and sometimes produced even double faith in Muscovite Rus'.

Alignment with administrative divisions

The following Federal districts of Russia are overwhelmingly European:

See also 
 North Asia
 Russian Far East
 Siberia
 Kievan Rus'

References

European Russia
Geography of Eastern Europe